Thomas Best (fl. 1446–1447) was an English politician.

He was a Member (MP) of the Parliament of England for Lewes from 1446 to 1447.

References

Year of birth missing
Year of death missing
English MPs 1447